Metals is a monthly peer-reviewed open access scientific journal covering related scientific research and technology development. It was established in 2011 and is published by MDPI in affiliation with the Portuguese Society of Materials and the Spanish Materials Society. The editor-in-chief is Hugo F. Lopez (University of Wisconsin-Milwaukee). The journal publishes reviews, regular research papers, short communications, and book reviews. There are occasional special issues.

Abstracting and indexing
The journal is abstracted and indexed in: 
Chemical Abstracts 
Current Contents/Engineering, Computing & Technology 
Current Contents/Physical, Chemical & Earth Sciences 
Science Citation Index Expanded
Scopus

References

External links
Official Website

Publications established in 2011
Open access journals
Materials science journals
Monthly journals
English-language journals
MDPI academic journals